Third hand may refer to:
 Helping hand (tool), also known as a third hand, a type of jig used in soldering and craftwork
 Autoblock, also known as a third hand, a rope device used in climbing and caving 
 The Third Hand, a 2007 album by RJD2
 The Third Hand (film), a 1981 Hong Kong adult film
 Judgement Day (1988 film), also known as The Third Hand, a 1988 American horror film
 Third-hand smoke, contamination by tobacco smoke following the extinguishing of a combustible tobacco product
 Third hand, see Glossary of contract bridge terms#thirdhand